Prepusa miranda is a species of beetle in the family Cicindelidae, the only species in the genus Prepusa.

References

Cicindelidae
Beetles described in 1843